Nicolas Feldhahn (born 14 August 1986) is a German former professional footballer who played as a defensive midfielder.

Career

Early career (2005–08)
In the 2005–06 season, Feldhahn made an appearance in the 2. Bundesliga and an appearance the German Cup for SpVgg Unterhaching. The following season, he scored four goals in 20 appearances and two appearances in the German Cup. He was sent–off in a 4–0 loss to 1. FC Kaiserslautern on 25 February 2007. He also appeared in six appearances for the reserve team. He was sent–off in a 1–0 win for the reserve team against Bayern Hof on 26 August 2006.

For the 2007–08 season, he played for Erzgebirge Aue. He scored a goal in 19 league appearances. He also made an appearance in the German Cup. This proved to be his only season for Erzgebirge Aue. He moved to Werder Bremen II the following season.

Life in the 3. Liga (2008–15)

He moved to Werder Bremen II for the 2008–09 season where he scored three goals in 32 appearances. He received 12 yellow cards during the season. During the 2009–10 season, he scored four goals in 35 appearances.

He then moved to Kickers Offenbach for the 2010–11 season. He scored three goals in 31 league appearances and a goal in three German Cup appearances. During the 2011–12 season, he made 14 league appearances. During the 2012–13 season, which ended up as his final season at the club, he scored two goals in 37 league appearances. He also made four German Cup appearances during the season.

He then moved to VfL Osnabrück for the 2013–14 season. In his first season, he scored five goals in 32 league appearances and two German Cup appearances. He was sent–off in a 3–1 loss to Rot-Weiß Erfurt on 28 September 2013. Again, during the 2014–15 season, he scored five goals in 32 league appearances.

Bayern Munich (2015–22)
During the 2015–16 season, he made a league appearance and a DFB-Pokal appearance before transferring to Bayern Munich II on 26 August 2015.

In the pre-season for the 2016–17 season, Feldhahn played for the first team. He played against Manchester City, A.C. Milan, Inter Milan, and Real Madrid. Carlo Ancelotti put Feldhahn on the bench for the 2016 DFL-Supercup against Borussia Dortmund and the first round of the 2016–17 DFB-Pokal against Carl Zeiss Jena. Feldhahn did not come into either match. During his time with the first team, he had also played for the reserve team. Bayern put Feldhahn in their UEFA Champions League squad for the 2016–17 season.

In May 2022 Feldhahn announced he would retire at the end of the 2021–22 season.

Career statistics

Honours
Bayern Munich
DFL-Supercup: 2016

References

External links

Living people
1986 births
Association football midfielders
German footballers
SpVgg Unterhaching players
FC Erzgebirge Aue players
SV Werder Bremen II players
Kickers Offenbach players
VfL Osnabrück players
FC Bayern Munich II players
2. Bundesliga players
3. Liga players
SpVgg Unterhaching II players
Footballers from Munich